Vladimir Polunin (1880 – 11 March 1957) was a scene painter.

Born in the Russian Empire, in 1908 Polunine moved to London to work as a designer for the Ballets russes. He was Diaghilev's chief scene-painter and worked with Picasso. Among Polunin's students was Karen Harris, daughter of the banker Sir Austin Harris. 

In London, he met one of the artists Serge Diaghilev was trying hard to get work for, the sculptor and costume designer Elizabeth Violet Hart. She was an English introduced in the Parisian Bohemia by Henri-Pierre Roché and heroine of the novel . They were married the same year. At that time he was a teacher at the Slade School of Fine Art.

He was the father of botanists Nicholas Polunin and Oleg Polunin, as well as physician Ivan Polunin.

Polunin died on 11 March 1957 in the UK.

Publication 
 The Continental Method of Scene Painting: Seven Years With the Diaghileff Company.

References

External links 
 Vladimir Polunin on the website of the BBC
 Vladimir Polunin on "Invaluable"
 Summer days, by Vladimir Polunin, 1930

Painters from the Russian Empire
1880 births
1957 deaths
Emigrants from the Russian Empire to the United Kingdom